The following is a list of Longwood Lancers men's basketball head coaches. There have been nine head coaches of the Lancers in their 47-season history.

Longwood's current head coach is Griff Aldrich. He was hired as the Lancers' head coach in March 2018, replacing Jayson Gee, who was fired after the 2017–18 season.

References

Longwood

Longwood Lancers basketball, men's, coaches